Mexico sent a delegation to compete at the 1976 Summer Paralympics in Toronto, Ontario, Canada. Its athletes finished twelfth in the overall medal count.

Medalist

See also 

 1976 Summer Paralympics
 Mexico at the 1976 Summer Olympics

References 

Nations at the 1976 Summer Paralympics
1976
Summer Paralympics